Waleed Majid (born 22 September 1987 in Kuwait) is a Qatari professional pool player. Majid has played in several World Cup of Pool events representing Qatar, including reaching the quarter-finals at the 2015 event.

Majid has also competed at the World Pool Masters competition, reaching the quarterfinals in 2015, defeating Daryl Peach.

Majid has also played Snooker at a high amateur level, most recently playing in the World Amateur Snooker Championship in 2018.

Achievements
 2022 Qatar 9-Ball Ranking Championship
 2021 Qatar 8-Ball Ranking Championship
 2014 Qatar Ranking Tournament
 2015 Qatar West Asian Championship
 2012 Qatar Ramadan Open Tournament 
 2012 Arab Ranking Tournament

References

External links

Qatari pool players
Living people
1987 births
Qatari snooker players